Donetsk Oblast, also referred to as Donechchyna, is an oblast in eastern Ukraine. It is Ukraine's most populous province, with around 4.1 million residents. Its administrative centre is Donetsk, though due to the ongoing Russo-Ukrainian War, the regional administration was moved to Kramatorsk. Historically, the region has been an important part of the Donbas region. From its creation in 1938 until November 1961, it bore the name Stalino Oblast as Donetsk was then named "Stalino", in honour of Joseph Stalin. As part of the de-Stalinization process, it was renamed after the Siversky Donets river, the main artery of Eastern Ukraine. Its population is estimated as 

The oblast is known for its urban sprawl of Donetsk–Makiivka and Horlivka–Yenakiieve and it is often associated with the coal mining industry.

In 2014, parts of the oblast, including Donetsk, came under the control of Russian-backed separatists who declared the Donetsk People's Republic, leading to a war against government forces; the de facto administrative center was subsequently moved to Mariupol and then Kramatorsk. During the 2022 Russian invasion of Ukraine, the oblast again became the site of heavy fighting, and Russia later declared the annexation of the entirety of the oblast as well as three other regions, though the annexation remains internationally unrecognized and only about half of the oblast is under Russian military occupation.

History
Before the establishment of the Donetsk Oblast, three districts (okruhas) existed on its territory from 1923 to 1930. The Donets Governorate was terminated in 1925. As part of Soviet Ukraine, the Donetsk Oblast was established on 2 July 1932 out of the Kharkiv Oblast, the Dnipropetrovsk Oblast and a number of raions that were under the direct administration of Kharkiv (then-capital of the Ukrainian Soviet Socialist Republic). Artemivsk (today Bakhmut) served as the oblast's administrative center for two weeks until 16 July 1932, when the city of Stalino (today Donetsk) took on the role. Until 1938, the Donetsian Oblast included the territories of the modern Donetsk Oblast and the Luhansk Oblast. In June 1938 it was split into the Stalino Oblast (modern Donetsk Oblast) and the Voroshylovhrad Oblast (modern Luhansk Oblast).

During the Nazi German occupation from fall 1941 to fall 1943, Donetsk Oblast was known as Yuzivka Oblast (after the original name of Donetsk). 

As part of de-Stalinization in the Soviet Union, in 1961 Stalino and Stalino Oblast were renamed Donetsk and Donetsk Oblast. 

During the dissolution of the Soviet Union, 83.9% of voters in Donetsk Oblast approved Ukraine's declaration of independence in the 1991 referendum.

In the mid-1990s, the region became known for its heightened criminal activity, including the killings of high-profile business people such as Akhat Bragin and Yevhen Shcherban. Donetsk Oblast was also a base for Ukraine's main pro-Russian political faction, Party of Regions, which became part of the Ukrainian government in 2002 and paved a way into Ukrainian politics for the powerful "Donetsk political clan".

In late 2004, the Party of Regions was involved in the creation of a political project, the South-East Ukrainian Autonomous Republic, which was intended to include Donetsk Oblast. Having close ties with the Russian government, the Party of Regions, along with local communists and other pro-Russian activists, instigated the pro-Russian unrest which escalated into the war in Donbas. In May 2014, the Ukrainian government lost control over its border with Russia in the Donetsk Oblast. Currently, the eastern part of the oblast is occupied by Russia.

On 30 September 2022 Russia annexed the Donetsk (DPR), Luhansk (Luhansk People's Republic), Zaporizhzhia, and Kherson Oblasts. The United Nations General Assembly subsequently passed a resolution calling on countries not to recognise what it described as an "attempted illegal annexation," demanded that Russia "immediately, completely and unconditionally withdraw" and most nations of the world have not recognized the annexations. As of the end of 2022, the oblast is divided roughly equally between the opposing sides.

Geography

Donetsk Oblast is located in southeastern Ukraine. The area of the oblast (26,517 km2), comprises about 4.4% of the total area of the country. The oblast borders the Dnipropetrovsk and Zaporizhzhia Oblasts on the southwest, the Kharkiv Oblast on the north, the Luhansk Oblast on the northeast, the Rostov Oblast in Russia on the east, and with the Sea of Azov on the south.

Its longitude from north to south is 270 km, from east to west – 190 km. The extreme points of the oblast's borders are: Bilosarayska Kosa (spit) on the south, Shevchenko of Velykonovosilkivskyi Raion on the west, Verkhnyi Kut of Shakhtarskyi Raion on the east, and Lozove of Lyman Raion on the north.

The state historic-architectural preserve near the city of Sviatohirsk with the Sviatohirsk Lavra was nominated for the Seven Wonders of Ukraine.

Administrative divisions

The province is primarily divided into 18 raions (districts) and 28 municipalities of equal status (22 miskradas and 6 mistos – cities of regional significance), including the provincial administrative center Donetsk. These are listed below with their areas and populations.

The province's secondary division consists of various municipalities that are governed by their councils. Those municipalities may consist of one or more populated places. All are administratively subordinate to the raion in which they are located.

The following data incorporates the number of each type of second-level administrative divisions of Donetsk Oblast:
 total of Settlements – 1,283, including:
 Villages – 1,124;
 Cities/Towns – 159, including:
 Urban-type settlement – 131;
 Cities of raion subordinance – 24;
 Selsovets – N/A.

The local administration of the oblast' is controlled by the Donetsk Oblast Rada. The governor of the oblast' is the Head of Donetsk Oblast administration, appointed by the President of Ukraine.

Cities
* regional municipalities

Demographics

In 2013, the population of Donetsk Oblast was 4.43 million, which constituted 10% of the overall Ukrainian population, making it the most populous and most densely populated region of the country, except for the cities with special status (Kyiv and Sevastopol). Its large population is due to the presence of several big industrial cities and numerous villages agglomerated around them.

During the 2004 presidential election, political supporters of Viktor Yanukovych threatened to demand autonomy for Donetsk and neighboring oblasts if the election of their candidate was not recognised. However, no official moves were ever made.

At the 2001 Ukrainian National Census, the ethnic groups within the Donetsk Oblast were: Ukrainians – 2,744,100 (56.9%), Russians – 1,844,400 (38.2%), Pontic Greeks – 77,500 (1.6%), Belarusians – 44,500 (0.9%), others (2.3%).

At the 2001 census, the languages spoken within the oblast were: Russian (spoken by 98.6% of Russians living there, 58.7% of Ukrainians, 58.7% of Greeks, and 85.5% of Belarusians) and Ukrainian (spoken by 41.2% of Ukrainians, 1.3% of Russians, 3.2% of Greeks, and 3.9% of Belarusians).

The oblast also contains 21% of the country's Muslims.

Age structure
 0–14 years: 12.6%  (male 283,584/female 266,977)
 15–64 years: 70.4%  (male 1,453,273/female 1,619,241)
 65 years and over: 17.0%  (male 243,048/female 496,434) (2013 official)

Median age
 total: 41.9 years 
 male: 38.0 years 
 female: 45.8 years  (2013 official)

Economy

Industry

The Donetsk Oblast accounts for more than one half of the coal, finished steel, coke, cast iron and steel production in Ukraine. Ferrous metallurgy, fuel industry and power industry are in demand in the structure of industry production. There are about 882 industry enterprises that are on independent balance, and 2,095 small industry enterprises in the oblast.

The oblast has a developed transport infrastructure which includes the Donetsk railway (covers 40% of national transportation), the Mariupol Port, the Donetsk International Airport, passenger airports in Mariupol and Kramatorsk, and dense road systems. In the Donetsk Oblast two special economic zones have been created, Donetsk and Azov, which have a privileged tax regime.

Agriculture

In 1999, the gross grain yield in the oblast was about 999.1 thousand tons, sugar beets – 27.1 thousand tons, sunflower seeds – 309.4 thousand tons, and potatoes – 380.2 thousand tons. Also, 134.2 thousand tons of meat, 494.3 thousand tons of milk and 646.4 million eggs have been produced. At the beginning of 1999 there were 2108 farms within the oblast.

Geology

The Donetsk Oblast's climate is mostly continental, which is characterised by hot summers and relatively cold winters with changeable snow surfaces. East and southeast strong winds, high temperatures and heavy rain showers are typical in the summer. The average annual rainfall is 524 mm.

The basic minerals found here are: coal (reserves – 25 billion tons), rock salt, lime carbonate, potassium, mercury, asbestos, and graphite. The area is also rich in fertile black earth.

Important resources for recreation within the area are: the mild climate, the Sea of Azov coast, curative mud, sources of minerals, and radon and table water. Due to these numerous recreation resources, many resort hotels and camps are located here. There are about 26 health centres and pensions, 52 rest homes and boarding houses, and rest camps for children in the oblast.

The curative areas in the oblast include the Slovyansk salt lakes and mineral water sources. The oblast also contains many park zones, some of which are of great national value. They include the Khomutivsky steppe and the Azov sea coast. Overall, the Donetsk Oblast contains about 70 protected park and nature attractions including branches of the Ukrainian steppe park, six state reserves, ten memorials of nature, landscapes, and six park tracts.

Polls
During the 1991 referendum, 83.90% of votes in Donetsk Oblast were in favour of the Declaration of Independence of Ukraine, fourth lowest in the country after Crimea, Sevastopol and Luhansk Oblast. A survey conducted in December 2014 by the Kyiv International Institute of Sociology found 18.5% of the oblast's population supported their region joining Russia, 53.8% did not support the idea, 22.5% were undecided, and 5.2% did not respond; insurgent-controlled areas (which hold over 50% of the population) were not polled.

See also

 Administrative divisions of Ukraine
 List of cities in Donetsk Oblast

References

External links

 Information Card of the Region – Official site of the Cabinet of Ministers of Ukraine
 www.citylife.donetsk.ua – Official Donetsk city guide – English 
 donoda.gov.ua – Official site of Donetsk Oblast Administration 
 catalogue.biz.ua – Post codes directory of Donetsk Oblast 
 

 
Oblasts of Ukraine
States and territories established in 1938
1938 establishments in Ukraine
Donbas
De-Stalinization
Ukrainian territories claimed by Russia